McCook may refer to:

People
McCook (surname)

Places
United States
McCook, Illinois
McCook, Nebraska
McCook, Texas
McCook County, South Dakota
McCook Field, Ohio
McCook (Amtrak station), Nebraska
McCook Army Airfield, Nebraska
McCook Regional Airport, Nebraska

Other uses
USS McCook, two different U.S. Navy ships